Mees Siers (born 6 October 1987 in Zelhem) is a retired Dutch professional footballer and current youth coach working at De Graafschap. He formerly played for De Graafschap, AGOVV Apeldoorn and Helmond Sport.

Coaching career
In 2018, Siers did an internship at NEC, working with the youth teams. At the end of the 2018-19 season, Siers retired and became a youth coach at De Graafschap.

References

External links
 
 Mees Siers Interview 

1987 births
Living people
Dutch footballers
De Graafschap players
AGOVV Apeldoorn players
Helmond Sport players
De Treffers players
Eerste Divisie players
Tweede Divisie players
People from Bronckhorst
Association football midfielders
Footballers from Gelderland
Dutch expatriate sportspeople in Iceland
Dutch expatriate sportspeople in Denmark
SønderjyskE Fodbold players
De Graafschap non-playing staff
Dutch expatriate footballers
Expatriate men's footballers in Denmark
Expatriate footballers in Iceland
Association football coaches